The 2001 Telenordia Swedish Open was a men's tennis tournament played on outdoor clay courts in Båstad in Sweden and was part of the International Series of the 2001 ATP Tour. It was the 54th edition of the tournament and ran from 9 July until 15 July 2001. Andrea Gaudenzi won the singles title.

Finals

Singles

 Andrea Gaudenzi defeated  Bohdan Ulihrach 7–5, 6–3
 It was Gaudenzi's 2nd title of the year and the 5th of his career.

Doubles

 Karsten Braasch /  Jens Knippschild defeated  Simon Aspelin /  Andrew Kratzmann 7–6(7–3), 4–6, 7–6(7–5)
 It was Braasch's 1st title of the year and the 2nd of his career. It was Knippschild's only title of the year and the 1st of his career.

References

External links
 ITF tournament edition details
 ATP tournament profile

2001 ATP Tour
2001
2001 in Swedish tennis
July 2001 sports events in Europe